The Armenian school in Larnaca, as of 1972 called "Nareg", after Saint Krikor Naregatsi, is located on 21, Armenian church street in central Larnaca, next to the Sourp Stepanos church. The current building was built between 1993-1995 by the Technical Services of the Ministry of Education and was inaugurated on 18 May 1996 by the then President of Cyprus Glafcos Clerides. Currently, the school has about 25 students. As all other Nareg Schools (Nicosia, Larnaca, Limassol), it is under a single principal, as of 2009 Vera Tahmazian, and under the tutelage of the Nareg Armenian Schools Committee.

The first Armenian school in Larnaca operated in 1909 by Rebecca Gomidassian. Soon, the Adana Bishop, Moushegh Seropian, donated funds for the construction of a small school building, thus the school was called "Mousheghian" National School. In 1917 Miss Hanemie Eramian donated funds for the construction of another room, next to the church. The large influx of refugee survivors of the Armenian genocide made imperative the use of a larger building. So, in 1923 the "Armenian National School" was built by the Adana Educational Association, while in 1926 another floor was added with the generous contribution of Garabed Melkonian, one of the founders of the Melkonian Educational Institute. The old school premises provided shelter for some of the Lebanese-Armenian refugees, who came to Cyprus between 1975-1990.

References

Armenian diaspora in Cyprus
High schools and secondary schools in Cyprus
Armenian schools